Old Rhine or Oude Rijn may refer to:

 Oude Rijn (Gelderland), a long former bend in river Rhine in the Dutch province of Gelderland
 Oude Rijn (Utrecht and South Holland), a branch of the Rhine delta in the Dutch provinces of Utrecht and South Holland
 Alter Rhein, the old river bed of the Alpine Rhine in St. Gallen and Vorarlberg in the Alpine Rhine Valley

See also 
 List of old waterbodies of the Rhine